Firestone is a planned elevated light rail station in the Los Angeles County Metro Rail system. It is located near the intersection of Firestone Boulevard and Atlantic Avenue in South Gate, California and is part of the West Santa Ana Branch Transit Corridor project. Measure M funds are programmed for a scheduled completion in 2041, though the station may be constructed for an opening between 2033 and 2035.

References

Railway stations in Los Angeles County, California
Huntington Park, California
Future Los Angeles Metro Rail stations
Railway stations scheduled to open in 2033